Dennis Archer (born 11 March 1963) is a Bermudian cricketer. He is a right-handed batsman and a right-arm medium-pace bowler. He made his debut for Bermuda against Trinidad & Tobago on 7 October 1998. He played for them in two ICC Trophies (in 2001 and 2005), and also in their two ICC Intercontinental Cup matches in 2004, which are his only first-class matches to date. His last game was the third place play off of the 2005 ICC Trophy against Canada on 11 July 2005.

External links

1963 births
Bermudian cricketers
Living people
Barbadian emigrants to Bermuda
Barbadian cricketers